Dhruv Rathee is an Indian YouTuber, vlogger and social media activist. He is known for his YouTube videos on social, political, and environmental issues. Additionally, Rathee maintains a separate channel dedicated to his personal life and travel vlogs.

Early life and education 
Rathee was born into a Hindu Jat family in the Indian state of Haryana. He received his primary education in Haryana before pursuing higher education in Germany. Rathee earned his bachelor's degree in mechanical engineering from Karlsruhe Institute of Technology, followed by a master's degree in renewable energy from the same institution.

Career 
Rathee is mainly known for his political videos, which mainly contain fact-checking and explanatory content, with a critical perspective of the Narendra Modi administration. According to ThePrint, Rathee was one of the first Indian users to use YouTube as a political platform, having started uploading travel videos in 2013 before shifting to political topics due to disillusionment with the Modi government after the 2014 Indian general election.

Rathee has addressed various topics in his videos, including the 2016 Uri attack, 2016 Indian Line of Control strike, 2016 Indian banknote demonetisation and Gurmehar Kaur row. Alongside his serious content, Rathee launched Pee News, a satirical "fake news" segment.  Additionally, from 2017 until early 2020, Rathee wrote opinion columns for ThePrint, a Indian digital media publication.

In July of 2020, Rathee began another YouTube channel called Dhruv Rathee Vlogs, where he shares his international travel vlogs. In addition to his travel vlogs, Rathee hosts various shows, including DW Travel of Deutsche Welle and Decode with Dhruv of Netflix India. He also hosts a podcast on Spotify called Maha Bharat with Dhruv Rathee. In 2020, Rathee released a video discussing the controversy and criticizing Kangana Ranaut's statements. In response, Ranaut threatened legal action against Rathee for "lying about BMC notice for my house." Some saw Ranaut's statement as an attempt to silence critics, while others defended her position, arguing that false statements could have harmful consequences for public figures like Ranaut.

, Dhruv Rathee began a shorts channel to share 60-second fact videos. This channel offers a quick and accessible way for viewers to engage with the information Rathee presents. In September 2022, he faced controversy when a video he posted about the political crisis in Pakistan was blocked by India's Ministry of Information and Broadcasting. The video contained a distorted map of India, in which parts of Kashmir were depicted as part of Pakistan or "disputed." This is considered a punishable offense under Indian law. What drew attention to the incident was the fact that Rathee had prior knowledge of the block.

Personal life 
Rathee is a resident of Germany. In November 2021, Rathee married his long-time girlfriend Juli Lbr at the historic Belvedere Palace, in Vienna, Austria. He considers himself a Hindu atheist.

See also 
 List of YouTubers

References

External links 

Ravish Kumar Interviews Dhruv Rathee on NDTV Prime Time

21st-century Indian journalists
Indian atheists
Indian emigrants to Germany
Indian mechanical engineers
Indian journalists
Indian YouTubers
Karlsruhe Institute of Technology alumni
Living people
People associated with renewable energy
People from Haryana
YouTube channels launched in 2013